This is a complete list of ice hockey players who were drafted in the Kontinental Hockey League Junior draft by the HC Lev Praha franchise. It includes every player who was drafted, regardless of whether they played for the team. Tomáš Rachůnek became Lev's first junior draft pick during the 2012 KHL Junior Draft.

Key

Draft picks
Statistics are complete as of the 2011–12 KHL season and show each player's career regular season totals in the KHL.  Wins, losses, ties, overtime losses and goals against average apply to goaltenders and are used only for players at that position. A player listed with a dash under the games played column has not played in the KHL.

See also
2012 KHL Junior Draft

References

Specific

General
2012 KHL Junior Draft: 

Kontinental Hockey League Junior Draft
Ice hockey in the Czech Republic